Hertfordshire Rangers F.C. were a 19th-century English amateur football team based in Watford, Hertfordshire. They competed in the FA Cup and had two 
players represent England in international matches.

History
The club (sometimes referred to as Herts Rangers) was founded in December 1865 and joined the Football Association in 1866.  Its first recorded match against external opposition was against a Westminster XI in December 1866, but the match was played to Westminster School rules (which allowed some running with the ball in hand, permitted opponents to trip a player running with the ball, had a kick-in rather than a throw-in, started the game with the ball being thrown up from the centre of the field, and had goals of 10' x 6') rather than Association laws.

The club first entered the FA Cup in 1875-76 and beat Rochester 4-0, the first of three wins the club ever had in the competition.  In the second round the club lost 8-2 to Oxford University.

The club's best Cup run came in 1880-81, with the club beating Barnes 6-0 in the first round (the club's record win), plus having three disallowed for offside, and getting a bye in the second.  In the third round, and in a warning that the club was finding it harder to provide a team, the club only had 10 players for a tie against Old Etonians at the Kennington Oval, and duly lost 3-0.

The Rangers often relied on players from Cambridge University students, as the university did not have a team at the time, and schools at Aldenham and Elstree.  In 1881-82 the club lost in the first round to the Swifts and did not enter the competition again; two of the club's players moved to Hendon F.C. and the others appear to have left the sport.  When the club ceased operation in December 1882, it was because they were unable to replace players who had left the schools for university.

A club bearing the same name was formed in 2001.

Colours

The club's first colours were dark orange and dark green, replaced in 1875 by black and grey.

Grounds

The club's first ground was behind cottages on the Watford High Road, near the Nascott estate, known as the Wood's Field, and by 1868 the club was using the White Lion Field in Watford.  In 1875 the club moved to Cassiobury Park in Upper Nascott.  The club used the Clarendon Hotel for its facilities until moving to the Malden Hotel in 1875.

Notable players
Two Rangers players were selected for England:

 Robert Barker (1872)
 Francis Sparks (1879)

References
 , pp. 11–13

External links
 
 Short article on old and new club's history from sponsor
 

Defunct football clubs in England
Defunct football clubs in Hertfordshire
1882 disestablishments in England
Association football clubs disestablished in 1882
Association football clubs established in 1865